Sassacus is also a genus of jumping spiders.

Sassacus (Massachusett:  Sassakusu, "fierce") ( – June 1637) was a Pequot sachem who was born near present-day Groton, Connecticut. He became grand sachem after his father, Tatobem, was killed in 1632. The Mohegans led by sachem Uncas rebelled against domination by the Pequots.  Sassacus and the Pequots were defeated by English colonists allied with the Narragansett and Mohegans in the Pequot War.

Sassacus fled to what he thought was safety among the Iroquois Mohawks in present-day New York state, but they murdered him and then sent his head and hands to the Connecticut Colony as a symbolic offering of friendship.

Sassacus possibly had a brother who married Ninigret's daughter, and his sister-in-law may have married Harman Garrett.

Footnotes

References
 Oberg, Michael Leroy, Uncas, First of the Mohegans, 2003, 
 Vaughan, Alden T. (1995). New England Frontier: Puritans and Indians, 1620-1675, p. 150. University of Oklahoma Press. 

1560s births
1637 deaths
17th-century Native Americans
Murdered Native American people
Native American leaders
People from Groton, Connecticut
People murdered in New York (state)
Male murder victims
Pequot people
People of colonial Connecticut
Native American people from Connecticut
Murder in 1637
Murder in the Thirteen Colonies